Vizzini is a town and comune in the Metropolitan City of Catania, on the island of Sicily, southern Italy.

The commune territory is bounded by the comuni of Buccheri, Francofonte, Giarratana, Licodia Eubea, Militello in Val di Catania, Mineo.

History 
Bidis, a Roman city mentioned by Pliny and Cicero, stood here in a territory that has been inhabited since prehistoric times.

The modern town developed in the Middle Ages around a now non-extant castle, as a fief of various lords, including the Chiaromontes and the Schittinos, although for many years it was also part of the royal domain.

In 1358, Roland of Sicily reconquered the area from Vizzini to Avola.

In 1415, the Jewish community of Vizzini was expelled by Queen Blanca, and was never permitted to return.

On the 14th of July, 1943 the town of Vizzini was liberated from fascist forces by the British military.  Specifically, by that time Vizzini was occupied by a small detachment of forces from Nazi Germany.  Britain's XXX Corps under General Montgomery consisting largely of M4 Sherman Tanks easily overpowered the small group of German tanks that were present in the town.  The town had been in the American occupational zone and this caused some confusion when British forces liberated the town first.

Main sights 

The Arab layout of the town is evident seen passing from Via Verga to Via San Gregorio Magno and proceeding as far as Largo della Matrice, a square with a modern statue of St Gregory in the middle and the Chiesa Madre (mother church) of San Gregorio Magno at one side.

The portal on the left flank of the church, in splendid 15th-century Gothic-Catalan style, probably derived from the old Town Hall, destroyed by the earthquake in 1693; in the interior there are late 18th century stuccos and a wooden ceiling by Natale Bonaiuto, as well as two paintings (The Martyrdom of St. Laurence and the Madonna delle Mercede) by Filippo Paladini (or Paladino), born in Florence about 1544. Another painting by Paladino, The Deposition (1607), is in the Chiesa del Convento dei Cappuccini.

Nearby is the church of Sant'Agata, rebuilt in the 18th century on the site of a previous 15th-century building and houses a pipe organ created around 1770.

The church of San Giovanni Battista was built in the 18th century. The stuccos decorating the interior are by Natale Bonaiuto.

The front of the church of Santa Teresa is said to be the setting for scenes from Cavalleria Rusticana, the libretto of which is based on the play of the same name by Giovanni Verga, who lived in Vizzini for a time.

The statue depicting the Madonna and Child (1527) in the Chiesa dei Minori Osservanti was sculpted by Antonello Gagini.

Religious buildings

 San Gregorio Magno, chiesa madre.
 Chiesa dello Spirito Santo
 Santa Maria di Gesù and convent
 San Vito
 Santissima Annunziata
 San Francesco di Paola
 Santa Maria del Pericolo
 San Sebastiano
 Santa Teresa
 Sant'Agata
 Chiesa del Convento dei Cappuccini
 Monastero Santa Maria dei Greci
 Santa Lucia

Palaces and other buildings
 Palazzo di Citta (early 19th century)
 Palazzo Verga (family of the writer)(18th century)
 Palazzo di città (municipio)(Town Hall Building)
 Palazzo Cannizzaro
 Palazzo Passanisi
 Palazzo Cafici
 Palazzo La Gurna
 Palazzo Trao
 Palazzo Gandolfo Maggiore

Culture
The writer Giovanni Verga used Vizzini as the setting for his Cavalleria Rusticana and Mastro Don Gesualdo, describing places and scenes that are still recognizable (the prickly pears of Cunziria, and in a sloping alley the house of the Trao family).

People
 Giovanni Verga (1840–1922), Italian realist writer.
 Lucio Marineo Siculo (1444–1533). Humanists Scholar at the University of Salamanca, Spain, teacher of translating Italian love poetry, Latin, and Greek lyrics into Spanish. Lived in the court of the Spanish kings Ferdinand and Isabel where he taught Joan Boscà i Almogàver.
 Matteo Agosta (1922–1964) was an Italian politician who represented the Christian Democracy party in the Chamber of Deputies from 1958 to 1964.

Economy
The economy of the commune is mainly agricultural (cereals, prickly pears, vegetables, sumac). Other activities include handmade shoes and carpentry.

Transportation
Buses travel to and near Vizzini regularly from surrounding cities Catania and Ragusa. Major operators include AST and ETNA.

The railway station Vizzini-Licodia is situated 6 km outside the city in the frazione of Vizzini Scalo.

Events
 Procession of "Sorrows" – Good Friday
 "A Cugnunta" – Easter Sunday
 "Ricotta and Cheese Festival" – 23, 24 and 25 April
 Festival of San Giuseppe – 19 April
 "Festival of Taste and Odours" – 2 June
 Festival of San Giovanni Battista – 28 and 29 August
 Events Verghiane – July / August
 Festival of the Patron San Gregorio Magno – 2 and 3 September
 "Rocksticana " – Rock music festival for emerging groups – September
 Traditional "Festival of the Dead" – 30–31 October and 1 November
 "Living Nativity" – December

See also
 Allied invasion of Sicily – during the Second World War Vizzini was captured on 14 July 1943.
 Di Blasi Industriale - is an Italian manufacturer of folding bicycles, tricycles, mopeds and scooter based in Vizzini, Sicily.

Twin towns
  Cerignola, Italy
 Aci Catena, Italy
 Livorno, Italy

References

External links
 Official website of the Comune di Vizzini 
 InfoVizzini.it – "The website of the Citizens of Vizzini"
 Vizzini Genealogy(Birth / Marriage / Death indices 1820-1860 / Military Draft Index 1840-1913) (Archived)
 Towards a typology of decorative façades in 18th-century Sicilian organs (Page 3)(Page 4)
 B-26 320th Bomb Group 1943 Missions – 10 July 1943 – Vizzini (Sicily) (Mission No.44 No. Aircraft 22) – Scanned pdf copy of the Mission Summary and strike photo.
  Vizzini - A Small Sicily City 

Municipalities of the Metropolitan City of Catania